Night Games is the thirty-first studio album by American country music artist Charley Pride. It was released in August 1983 via RCA Records. The includes the singles "Night Games" and "Ev'ry Heart Should Have One".

Track listing

Chart performance

References

1983 albums
Charley Pride albums
Albums produced by Norro Wilson
RCA Records albums